Copper(II) laurate is an metal-organic compound with the chemical formula . It is classified as a metallic soap, i.e. a metal derivative of a fatty acid.

Synthesis
Copper(II) laurate can be obtained by reacting sodium laurate and copper sulfate in an aqueous solution at 50-55 °C.

Physical properties
Copper(II) laurate forms light blue crystals.

Does not dissolve in water.

References

Laurates
Copper compounds